Shabana Mahmood (born 17 September 1980) is a British Labour Party politician and barrister serving as the Member of Parliament (MP) for Birmingham Ladywood since 2010. She has served in the Shadow Cabinet of Keir Starmer as the Labour Party National Campaign Coordinator since 2021. She also served as Shadow Chief Secretary to the Treasury in 2015.

Early life
Mahmood was born and brought up in Birmingham. Her family roots are from Mirpur, in Azad Kashmir, Pakistan. Her father is a civil engineer and chair of the local Labour party. She spent five years living in Ta'if after he relocated there. She attended Small Heath comprehensive school and King Edward VI Camp Hill School for Girls in Birmingham.

Mahmood graduated from Lincoln College, Oxford where she studied law and was the president of the Junior Common Room. She is a qualified barrister, specialising in professional indemnity.

Parliamentary career
In the 2010 general election, Mahmood was elected for Birmingham Ladywood with a majority of 10,105, succeeding Labour minister Clare Short who stood down. Along with Rushanara Ali and Yasmin Qureshi, Mahmood became one of the UK's first female Muslim MPs.

Mahmood served a number of front bench positions under Ed Miliband's leadership, including Shadow Minister for Prisons, Shadow Minister for Higher Education, and Shadow Financial Secretary to the Treasury.

Following the 2015 general election, Mahmood was appointed to the Shadow Cabinet as Shadow Chief Secretary to the Treasury. In September 2015, following Jeremy Corbyn's election as Labour leader, Mahmood stepped down from the role, saying she "strongly disagreed" with him on the economy.

In January 2016, Mahmood was elected to represent the Parliamentary Labour Party on Labour's National Executive Committee, and was re-elected in July 2016. In November 2016, Mahmood was elected one of the vice chairs of Labour's National Policy Forum.

She supported Owen Smith in the failed attempt to replace Jeremy Corbyn in the 2016 Labour Party (UK) leadership election.

In November 2016, Mahmood did not vote on a motion in Parliament for the UK to withdraw support for the Saudi Arabian-led intervention in Yemen.

She was re-elected in the 2017 snap election, increasing her vote share to over 80%, one of the highest in the country; she retained her seat in the 2019 general election with a slight decrease to her substantial majority.

After Labour's loss in the 2019 election, Mahmood was asked to commission a review launched by Labour Together of the party's election performance. She was joined by Lucy Powell, Ed Miliband, Jo Platt and others. Consequently, she did not nominate any candidate for the 2020 Labour Party leadership election or deputy election.

Mahmood has served on the Public Accounts Committee between September 2017 and April 2021.

In the May 2021 British shadow cabinet reshuffle, Mahmood returned to the Shadow Cabinet as Labour Party National Campaign Coordinator, replacing Angela Rayner in the role.

Electoral performance

Awards and nominations
In January 2014, Mahmood was nominated for the Politician of the Year award at the British Muslim Awards.

In October 2015, she was named as one of the winners of the women's magazine Marie Claire's Women at the Top Awards.

In 2018, Mahmood was named as one of the Brummies Who Inspire in celebration of the 175th anniversary of Birmingham City University.

References

External links

Shabana Mahmood MP Official constituency website

1980 births
Living people
Alumni of Lincoln College, Oxford
British politicians of Pakistani descent
English Muslims
English people of Pakistani descent
Female members of the Parliament of the United Kingdom for English constituencies
English people of Mirpuri descent
Labour Party (UK) MPs for English constituencies
People from Small Heath, Birmingham
UK MPs 2010–2015
UK MPs 2015–2017
UK MPs 2017–2019
UK MPs 2019–present
21st-century British women politicians
21st-century English women
21st-century English people